Marie Lehmann may refer to

 Marie Lehmann (soprano) (1851–1931), German soprano
 Marie Lehmann (journalist) (born 1965), Swedish sports journalist and television host